Le Moignan is a surname derived from a placename in Seine-Maritime. Notable people with the surname include:

 Christina Le Moignan (born 1942), British Methodist minister and academic
 Martine Le Moignan (born 1962), squash player from Guernsey who represented England
 Michel Le Moignan (1919–2000), Canadian Catholic priest and politician

References